The 2011–2012 session was a session of the California State Legislature. The session first convened on December 6, 2010, and adjourned sine die on November 30, 2012.

Major events

Vacancies and special elections 
July 13, 2010: Senator Dave Cox (R–1st) dies from prostate cancer
October 20, 2010: Senator Jenny Oropeza (D–28th) dies of complications from a blood clot. Despite her death, she wins re-election, thus prolonging the seat's vacancy and necessitating a special election
December 21, 2010: Senator George Runner (R–17th) resigns after his election to the State Board of Equalization
January 4, 2011: Assemblyman Ted Gaines (R–4th) wins the special election for the 1st Senate District seat to replace Cox and is sworn in on January 6
January 10, 2011: Mayor Gavin Newsom (D–San Francisco) is sworn in as Lieutenant Governor (and Senate President), replacing Abel Maldonado
February 15, 2011: Former Assemblywoman Sharon Runner (R–36th) wins the special election for the 17th Senate District seat to replace George Runner and is sworn in on February 18
February 15, 2011: Former Assemblyman Ted Lieu (D–53rd) wins the special election for the 28th Senate District seat to replace Oropeza and is sworn in on February 18
May 3, 2011: Beth Gaines (R–Roseville) wins the special election for the 4th Assembly District seat to replace Ted Gaines and is sworn in on May 12
September 1, 2012: Doug LaMalfa (R–4th) resigned to run for Congress

Leadership changes 
January 5, 2012: Senator Bob Huff (R–29th) replaces Senator Bob Dutton (R–31st) as Senate Republican Leader, as Dutton is termed out at the end of the term

Party changes 
March 28, 2012: Assemblyman Nathan Fletcher (R–75th) leaves the Republican Party to become an independent

Senate

Officers 

The Secretary and the Sergeant-at-Arms are not members of the Legislature.

Members

Assembly

Officers 

The Chief Clerk and the Sergeant-at-Arms are not members of the Legislature.

Members

See also
 List of California state legislatures

References

External links 
 California State Senate
 California State Assembly

2011-2012
2011 in California
2012 in California
2011 U.S. legislative sessions
2012 U.S. legislative sessions